Sapkota(Nepali: सापकोटा, Sapkota) is a surname among the Upadhya Brahmin/Bahun families in Nepal and Indian states Uttarakhand, Sikkim and some part of North and northeast India.

The surname originated in the Nepalese state of Bagmati, Lumbini where it is amongst the most common Brahmin surnames. Today, the name is found across Nepal, as well as in the Nepalese diaspora.

Notable people bearing the surname include:
 Agni Prasad Sapkota (born 1958), Nepalese politician
 Abjanath Sapkota, Nepalese Politician, NCP(Unified Socialist)
 Bhakta Bahadur Sapkota (born 1947), Nepalese long-distance runner
 Bidur Prasad Sapkota, Nepalese politician
 Janak Sapkota (born 1987), Nepalese haiku poet
 Mahananda Sapkota (1896–1977), Nepalese social worker, etymologist, linguist, and poet
 Arjun Sapkota (Born 1999) , Nepalese folk singer , song-writer and musician 

Surnames of Nepalese origin
Khas surnames